Enixotrophon carduelis is a species of sea snail, a marine gastropod mollusk in the family Muricidae, the murex snails or rock snails.

Description

Distribution
This marine species occurs off New Zealand and in the Australian part of the Tasman Sea.

References

External links
 Watson, R. B. (1879-1883). Mollusca of H.M.S. 'Challenger' Expedition. Journal of the Linnean Society of London. 14
 Marshall B.A. & Houart R. (2011) The genus Pagodula (Mollusca: Gastropoda: Muricidae) in Australia, the New Zealand region and the Tasman Sea. New Zealand Journal of Geology and Geophysics 54(1): 89–114
 Barco, A.; Marshall, B.; A. Houart, R.; Oliverio, M. (2015). Molecular phylogenetics of Haustrinae and Pagodulinae (Neogastropoda: Muricidae) with a focus on New Zealand species. Journal of Molluscan Studies. 81(4): 476-488

Gastropods of New Zealand
Gastropods described in 1882
Enixotrophon